Arkadelphia station is an Amtrak train station located at 798 South Fifth Street in Arkadelphia, Arkansas, in the restored Missouri Pacific Railroad station. Arkadelphia is a stop for the Texas Eagle.  The station also serves as the headquarters for the regional transit agency.

See also

List of Amtrak stations

References

External links 

Amtrak Texas Eagle Stations - Arkadelphia, AR

Arkadelphia Amtrak Station (USA Rail Guide -- Train Web)
Clark County Listings at the National Register of Historic Places

Amtrak stations in Arkansas
Former Missouri Pacific Railroad stations
Railway stations on the National Register of Historic Places in Arkansas
Railway stations in the United States opened in 1917
Buildings and structures in Arkadelphia, Arkansas
Transportation in Clark County, Arkansas
National Register of Historic Places in Clark County, Arkansas